Reginald Maitland (6 March 1851 – 10 April 1926) was an English-born Scottish international rugby union player.

Rugby Union career

Amateur career

He played for the Royal Artillery rugby union side.

International career

He was called up to the Scotland squad in 1872 and played England at The Oval on 5 February 1872.

Cricket career

Maitland played cricket for Marylebone Cricket Club.

Army career

Maitland served in the Royal Artillery.

References

1851 births
1926 deaths
Scottish rugby union players
Scotland international rugby union players
Scottish cricketers
Marylebone Cricket Club cricketers
Rugby union players from Hampshire
Rugby union three-quarters